Holyrood is a fortnightly current affairs and politics magazine. Created following the advent of devolution in the UK in 1999 the magazine provides coverage of the goings on at the Scottish Parliament, as well as interviews with leading political figures. It is a politically independent publication. Holyrood Communications also encompasses Holyrood Events, a provider of public sector events and conferences. The technology sub-brand, Holyrood Connect, provides events and the latest news, opinion and analysis on the technology sector across the UK.

History
The magazine was originally owned by Parliamentary Communications, then in 2002 was bought out by Holyrood Communications. Dods acquired Holyrood Communications in 2012. Dods were hoping to benefit from the increased political activity that was expected in Scotland in the following two years. In December 2015 the Holyrood Communications staff moved into new premises at Panmure Court on Calton Road in Edinburgh.

Some of the interviews published by the magazine have had a high profile.

References

External links
 
 Holyrood Events
 Holyrood Connect

Political magazines published in Scotland
Magazines established in 1999
Mass media in Edinburgh
Biweekly magazines published in the United Kingdom
Magazines published in Scotland
1999 establishments in Scotland